Madurella is a fungal genus of Hyphomycetes, of uncertain position in the Sordariales, and sometimes classified as Mitosporic Ascomycota.

It includes:
 Madurella grisea
 Madurella mycetomatis

Madurella mycetomatis is a main cause of black-grain mycetoma, sometimes called maduromycosis, an infection of human extremities and rarely the nervous system, in arid regions of east Africa and Asia. The origin is soil and its dark agar colonies are often sterile, although sclerotia are often produced, and short chains of 1-celled conidia sometimes occur. A molecular assay distinguishes the four species based on rolling circle amplification of the internal transcribed spacer of the ribosomal DNA (ITS).

References

External links
 http://www.mycology.adelaide.edu.au/Fungal_Descriptions/Hyphomycetes_(hyaline)/Madurella/

Sordariales